The 1900–01 season was Newton Heath's ninth season  in the Football League and their seventh in the Second Division. They finished 10th in the league, some way off the promotion places. In the FA Cup, the Heathens were knocked out by Burnley after a replay in the First Round, having beaten Portsmouth in the Intermediate Round.

The club also entered teams in the Lancashire and Manchester Senior Cups in 1900–01. Although they were knocked out by Manchester City in the second round of the Lancashire Cup, the Heathens managed to reach the final of the Manchester Senior Cup for the first time since 1893 before being beaten by the same opposition.

Second Division

FA Cup

Manchester United F.C. seasons
Newton Heath